Black Money is a 2019 South Korean crime drama film  directed by Jung Ji-young, starring Cho Jin-woong and Lee Hanee. The film was loosely based on the sale of the Korean Exchange Bank to the American equity firm Lone Star Funds.

Synopsis 
Yang Min-hyuk (Cho Jin-woong) works as a prosecutor for the Seoul District Prosecutor's Office. He deals with case involving Park Soo-kyung (Lee Eun-woo), an employee of Daehan Bank, who bumped into multiple cars on the freeway. Days later, Park Soo-kyung is found dead. Prior to her death, her last text message was sent to her younger sister. She claimed that she was sexually assaulted by Prosecutor Yang. Her death is then ruled a suicide,  and Min-hyuk attempts to clear his name. With his investigation, he soon learns that Park Soo-kyung was murdered, and she was also a witness to the sale of Daehan Bank for an unusually low price. Min-hyuk also encounters Kim Na-ri (Lee Hanee). She works as an attorney for Daehan Bank. A massive financial corruption case stands in front of Min-hyuk.

Cast

Main
 Cho Jin-woong as Yang Min-hyuk
 Lee Hanee as Kim Na-ri

Supporting

 Lee Geung-young as Lee Kwang-joo
 Kang Shin-il as Investigator Jang
 Choi Deok-moon as Seo Kwon-young
 Jo Han-chul as Kim Nam-kyu
 Heo Sung-tae as Prosecutor Choi
 Yoon Byung-hee as Investigator Park
 Seo Hyun-chul as Im Seung-man
 Nam Myung-ryul as Na-ri's father.
 Jung Min-sung as PD Oh
 Kim Jong-tae as PD Yoon
 Lee Eun-woo as Park Soo-kyung

Special appearance

 Lee Sung-min as Choi Yong-wook
 Moon Sung-keun as Kang Ki-choon
 Jung In-gi as Priest
 Lee Jae-yong as CEO of broadcasting company
 Ryu Seung-soo as Lead Deputy Choi
 Yoo Tae-o as Steve Jung

Release 
The film premiered in South Korean cinemas on November 13, 2019. It was invited to open the 18th Florence Korea Film Fest in September 2020.

Reception

Critical response 
The film received mostly mixed reviews from critics. Praise was given to acting performances, while the plot felt a bit formulaic and shallow.

Yoon Min-sik from The Korea Herald wrote, "The film is justified in taking liberties and assuming all the allegations in the real-life case are true, given that it is, after all, a film. What I do have a problem with is how it tells the story. It uses a lot of cliches and a predictable plot to introduce very one-dimensional characters who are clearly meant to be just evil."

William Schwartz from HanCinema wrote, "Both Cho Jin-woong and Lee Hanee manage to put in surprisingly convincing performances as they slowly come to realize there are much bigger ethical issues at play than the ones that caused them to get involved in the case. Unfortunately, the formulaic construction of the script becomes especially grating near the end, where epic musical cues punctuate a theatrical set piece wherein incriminating documents are disseminated to an angry mob."

Box office 
On its opening day, the film finished first place at the box office by attracting 111,661 moviegoers. After five days of strong performance, the film surpassed 1 million admissions on November 17. During its opening weekend, the film topped box office with US$5.3 million gross from 627,000 attendance. On November 28, 16 days after its release, the film surpassed 2 million admissions.

As of June 20, 2022, the film attracted 2,480,257 moviegoers with US$16.2 million gross.

Awards and nominations

References

External links
 
 
 

2019 films
2019 crime drama films
2010s Korean-language films
South Korean crime drama films
2010s South Korean films